Gregory Bonsignore (born 1983) is an International Playwright, television program creator, director for theatre, television and film, Producer, novelist, musical theatre librettist & lyricist, screenwriter, comedian and actor.

Life and career
Bonsignore grew up in Houston, Texas. He has identified as neuroatypical and non-binary. He earned his bachelor's degree in Storytelling at New York University, trained at the BBC in London, and is a graduate of The "BMI Lehman Engel Musical Theatre Workshop".

Bonsignore was Playwright in Residence at The Library of Alexandria in Egypt.  His play "A Derbyshire Pub Quiz", a collaboration with Cultural Geographer George Jaramillo on Imagined Landscapes, premiered at The Royal Geographical Society's Annual Conference in Exeter, September 2015.,.

Off-Broadway, he wrote the Book and Lyrics for the Musical Atomic, behind the scenes of The Manhattan Project, (World-Premiere in Sydney - Winner Best Musical, Australia), Three (Clurman Theatre, Sam French Prize finalist), premiere at City Theatre's Best American Shorts Festival - Miami, and wrote book/lyrics & directed "Gorgonzola: A Cautionary Sicilian Tale" a new musical, that premiered Off-Broadway in 2016, and won Best Musical, Best Music and Best Lyrics, Best Actor & Best Actress - more than any show in the festival's history. Most recently his Broadway workshop of The Talented Mr. Ripley was selected for development by Stephen Schwartz in his ASCAP Workshop.

In 2020, Bonsignore was Deputy Director for Michigan's Get Out the Vote campaign, where Grand Rapids' historically-Republican Kent County flipped Democratic, and again in Georgia for the 2021 Senate Run-Off Election.

Bonsignore created the critically acclaimed cult comedy series Squad 85 (for Executive Producer Justin Lin), Writer/Director of the satirical film "...or Die" (Best Short - HBO Film Festival), credited as a writer for "The Webby Awards" and "Side by Side with Susan Blackwell", worked for three years in NYC as a stand-up, and worked on many TV series, including Transformers: Rescue Bots, Homeland, Lie to Me, Three Rivers, In Plain Sight, Hustle, and a musical episode of My Little Pony: Friendship Is Magic - voted by fans as their Favorite Episode of the Series

His 2019 feature, for Oprah Winfrey's HARPO Films - "Can You Tell Me How" about Sesame Street Creator Joan Ganz Cooney and Jim Henson was selected for The Blacklist (survey). His children's illustrated book, "That's Betty: The Story of Betty White" was sold to Henry Holt and Company for a Fall 2021 release.  The book follows a boy tasked with doing a presentation on a trailblazing woman, and for him, there's only one choice: Betty White. He gets a helping hand from a certain pioneer and icon who happens to be in the library on the same day.

Television

Screenwriting
 Lie to Me (2010)
 Squad 85 (2012)
 Transformers: Rescue Bots (2015-2016)
 My Little Pony: Friendship is Magic (2018)

Director
 Squad 85 (2012)

Producer
 Chasing Farrah (2005): production coordinator
 Hustle (2007): production assistant
 Squad 85 (2012)

Script coordinator
 In Plain Sight (2009)
 Three Rivers (2009-2010)
 Lie to Me (2010-2011)
 Bunheads (2013)
 Homeland (2013)

References

1983 births
Living people
American musical theatre librettists
American musical theatre lyricists
21st-century American dramatists and playwrights
Television show creators
American writers of Italian descent
American gay actors
American gay writers
American LGBT screenwriters
Gay comedians
American male dramatists and playwrights
21st-century American screenwriters
Non-binary comedians
American non-binary actors
LGBT people from Texas
American LGBT comedians
American transgender writers
American non-binary writers